Bruno César Correa (born 22 March 1986), sometimes known as just Bruno is a Brazilian footballer who is currently plays for Chainat Hornbill.

Club career 
He joined the Iranian Sepahan in 2012 and Esteghlal (Iranian champions) at 2013.

Club statistics
Last Update  7 July 2012

Honours
Sepahan
Iran Pro League (1): 2011–12
Individual
Armenian Premier League 2010–11 Season Best striker

References

External links

PersianLeague Profile

1986 births
Living people
Armenian Premier League players
Brazilian footballers
Brazilian expatriate footballers
Expatriate footballers in Armenia
Expatriate footballers in Iran
Expatriate footballers in South Korea
Expatriate footballers in the United Arab Emirates
Expatriate footballers in Japan
Expatriate footballers in Hong Kong
Incheon United FC players
Sepahan S.C. footballers
Al-Nasr SC (Dubai) players
Dubai CSC players
Botafogo de Futebol e Regatas players
Clube Atlético Bragantino players
Shonan Bellmare players
Eastern Sports Club footballers
Bruno Correa
K League 1 players
J1 League players
Persian Gulf Pro League players
UAE Pro League players
Hong Kong Premier League players
Association football forwards